Kås or Kaas is a town in North Jutland, Denmark. It is located in Jammerbugt Municipality. The town has nearly grown together with Pandrup, with only half a kilometer separating the two towns. Kås itself has grown together with the village of Moseby.

History
Kås is known from 1463 as Kaalsz. In 1610 the name had changed to Kaas.

A train station was located in Kås between 1913 and 1969. The station was built by Sylvius Knutzen and was a stop on the Hjørring-Løkken-Aabybro railroad.

References

Cities and towns in the North Jutland Region
Jammerbugt Municipality